Group A of the 2019 Copa América took place from 14 to 22 June 2019. The group consisted of Bolivia, hosts Brazil, Peru, and Venezuela.

Brazil and Venezuela as the top two teams, along with Peru as one of the two best third-placed teams, advanced to the quarter-finals.

Teams

Notes

Standings

In the quarter-finals:
The winners of Group A, Brazil, advanced to play the third-placed team of Group B, Paraguay.
The runners-up of Group A, Venezuela, advanced to play the runners-up of Group B, Argentina.
The third-placed team of Group A, Peru, advanced as one of the two best third-placed teams to play the winners of Group C, Uruguay.

Matches

Brazil vs Bolivia

Venezuela vs Peru

Bolivia vs Peru

Brazil vs Venezuela

Peru vs Brazil

Bolivia vs Venezuela

Discipline
Fair play points would have been used as tiebreakers if the overall and head-to-head records of teams were tied. These were calculated based on yellow and red cards received in all group matches as follows:
first yellow card: minus 1 point;
indirect red card (second yellow card): minus 3 points;
direct red card: minus 4 points;
yellow card and direct red card: minus 5 points;

Only one of the above deductions were applied to a player in a single match.

References

External links

Copa América Brasil 2019, CONMEBOL.com

Group A
Brazil at the 2019 Copa América